Junagarh or Junagadh may refer to the following places in India :

 Junagadh, a town in Junagadh district, Gujarat
 Junagadh State, a former princely salute state with seat in the above town
 Junagadh district, a district of Gujarat
 Junagarh Fort, a fort in Bikaner, Rajasthan
 Junagarh, Kalahandi, a town in Kalahandi district, Odisha
 Junagarh (Odisha Vidhan Sabha constituency), an Assembly constituency, Odisha